Viddalsdammen (Norwegian for "The Viddal Dam") is a lake and a reservoir in Aurland Municipality in Vestland county, Norway.

The reservoir was formed as part of the building of the Aurland Hydroelectric Power Station in the 1960s and 1970s when a rock-fill dam was built at the end of the lake Viddalsvatnet. Viddalsdammen receives water through an extensive system of water tunnels that extends around the entire Aurland valley.

See also
List of lakes in Norway

References

Lakes of Vestland
Aurland
Reservoirs in Norway